Dexter Edgar Converse (1829–1899) a was a textile entrepreneur who was co-founder and namesake of Converse College. Converse was native of Vermont who had moved to Spartanburg prior to the American Civil War and had become a successful pioneer in the cotton mill industry, and served as the head of the Converse College's first board of directors and was among the school's founders and substantial donors.

Early life
Dexter Edgar Converse was born in Swanton, Vermont to Louisa Twichell and Olin Converse, a wool manufacturer. Olin Converse was a descendant of Edward Convers, an early Puritan settler in the Massachusetts Bay Colony, who landed in Salem, Massachusetts in 1629 as part of the  John Winthrop Fleet. After his father's death in 1832, Dexter was raised by an uncle in Quebec who was also a woolen manufacturer. When he was twenty-one, Converse went to work at a mill in Cohoes, New York with another uncle, Winslow Twichell, and while there married a cousin, Helen Twichell.

Move to North Carolina
In 1854 the Converses moved to Lincolnton, North Carolina to run a mill there, but moved to Bivingsville (now Glendale, South Carolina in February 1855 but that mill failed shortly afterwards, but Converse was able to buy an ownership stake of the mill at a bankruptcy sale. At the outset of the Civil War, Converse's loyalty to the Confederacy was questioned so he and his brother-in-law, Albert Twichell, enlisted in the Confederate Army, but mill colleagues convinced Converse to remain running the mill and producing cotton products for the Confederate Army. After the War in 1866, he founded D.E. Converse Co. (Glendale Mills) and in 1880, he co-founded the Clifton Manufacturing Co. and acquired shares in the Pacolet, Whitney and Spartan Mills.

Philanthropy and death
In 1891 the Converses left Glendale and moved to Spartanburg, where in 1889 the Converses co-founded the women's college which became Converse College. The campus had a Twichell Auditorium, which was named for his in-laws. Converse died in 1899, and "he was buried in front of Main Hall, as he had requested. Later Helen Converse had her husband's body re-interred in nearby Oakwood Cemetery. Founder's Monument was placed just inside the main entrance to the college." His house, the Bivings-Converse House remains in Glendale, South Carolina and is listed the National Register of Historic Places.

References

1829 births
1899 deaths
Philanthropists from Vermont
Philanthropists from South Carolina
Converse University alumni
University and college founders
People from Swanton (town), Vermont
People of Vermont in the American Civil War
People of South Carolina in the American Civil War
American Civil War industrialists
American chief executives
19th-century American philanthropists